Hervé Mangon (31 July 1821 – 17 May 1888) was a French politician of the French Third Republic. He was born in Paris, France. He was minister of agriculture (6 April – 9 November 1885) in the cabinet of Henri Brisson. He was a commander of the Legion of Honour.

Sources

Bibliography
 Hervé Mangon, par Gaston Tissandier, La Nature no. 782 - 26 mai 1888

1821 births
1888 deaths
French Ministers of Agriculture
People of the French Third Republic
Commandeurs of the Légion d'honneur